There are 94 active United States district and territorial courts. Each of the 50 states has between one and four district courts, and the District of Columbia and Puerto Rico each have a district court.

The insular areas of Guam, the Northern Mariana Islands, and the United States Virgin Islands each have one territorial court; these courts are called "district courts" and exercise the same jurisdiction as district courts, but differ from district courts in that territorial courts are Article IV courts, with judges who serve ten-year terms rather than the lifetime tenure of judges of Article III courts, such as the district court judges. American Samoa does not have a district court or a federal territorial court, and so federal matters there are sent to either the District of Columbia or Hawaii.

Definition 

The district courts were established by Congress under Article III of the United States Constitution.  The courts hear civil and criminal cases, and each is paired with a bankruptcy court.  Appeals from the district courts are made to one of the 13 courts of appeals, organized geographically. The number of district courts in a court of appeals' circuit varies between one and thirteen, depending on the number of states in the region and the number of districts in each state.
The formal naming convention for the district courts is "United States District Court for" followed by the district name. Each district court has one or more meeting places at which it holds hearings and conducts business. Many federal courthouses are named after notable judges, such as the Thurgood Marshall United States Courthouse in New York City or the Hugo L. Black Courthouse in Birmingham. The largest courthouse is the Thomas F. Eagleton United States Courthouse, which serves the Eastern District of Missouri.

The largest courts by number of judges are the Central District of California and the Southern District of New York, each with 28 judgeships. The smallest are the District for the Northern Mariana Islands and the District of Guam, with one judgeship each.

Active courts 

 Key

Defunct courts 

Note: Defunct courts do not include courts consisting of an entire state that were later subdivided.

Subdivided courts

See also 
 List of United States federal courthouses
 List of former United States district courts

References 
General
 
 
 

Specific

External links 
 

courts